The 1983 Big East men's basketball tournament took place at Madison Square Garden in New York City. Its winner received the Big East Conference's automatic bid to the 1983 NCAA tournament. It is a single-elimination tournament with three rounds. Boston College had the best regular season conference record and received the #1 seed.  It was the first year that the tournament was held at Madison Square Garden, where it has been held since.

Led by Chris Mullin, St. John's defeated Boston College in the championship game 85–77.

Bracket

Awards
Most Valuable Player: Chris Mullin, St. John's

All Tournament Team
 John Garris, Boston College
 Billy Goodwin, St. John's
 Stewart Granger, Villanova
 Jay Murphy, Boston College
 Leo Rautins, Syracuse

References 

 

Tournament
Big East men's basketball tournament
Basketball competitions in New York City
College sports in New York City
Sports in Manhattan
Big East men's basketball tournament
Big East men's basketball tournament
1980s in Manhattan
Madison Square Garden